Local church may refer to:
 Church, a congregation meeting in a particular location
 Local churches (affiliation), a Christian group founded by Watchman Nee
 Parish church, a local church united with other parishes under a bishop or presbyter
 Congregationalist polity, a form of church organization by which each local church that governs itself independently
 Particular church, Roman Catholic ecclesial community
 "Local church" is the expression used to designate an autocephalous church in Eastern Orthodoxy

See also
 Ecclesiastical polity, church government and structure